Frank Bee Haller (January 6, 1883 – April 30, 1939) was an American featherweight professional boxer who competed in the early twentieth century. He won a silver medal in Boxing at the 1904 Summer Olympics, beating fellow American Frederick Gilmore, but losing to Oliver Kirk in the final.

He was born in San Francisco, California and died in St. Louis, Missouri.

References

External links
 
 

1883 births
1939 deaths
Boxers from San Francisco
Olympic boxers of the United States
Featherweight boxers
Olympic silver medalists for the United States in boxing
Boxers at the 1904 Summer Olympics
Place of birth missing
American male boxers
Medalists at the 1904 Summer Olympics